Billboard Top Hits: 1982 is a compilation album released by Rhino Records in 1992, featuring ten hit recordings from 1982.

The track lineup includes four songs that reached the top of the Billboard Hot 100 chart and the remaining six songs each reaching the top three of the Hot 100.

Track listing

Track information and credits were taken from the album's liner notes.

References

1992 compilation albums
Billboard Top Hits albums